
Year 208 BC was a year of the pre-Julian Roman calendar. At the time it was known as the Year of the Consulship of Marcellus and Crispinus (or, less frequently, year 546 Ab urbe condita). The denomination 208 BC for this year has been used since the early medieval period, when the Anno Domini calendar era became the prevalent method in Europe for naming years.

Events 
 By place 

 Roman Republic 
 The Romans under Publius Cornelius Scipio defeat the Carthaginians under their commander Hasdrubal Barca at Baecula (Bailen) in Baetica. As a result, Hasdrubal Barca decides to cross the Pyrenees with his remaining troops into Transalpine Gaul, with the intention of joining his brother Hannibal in Italy.
 The Roman general Marcus Claudius Marcellus is killed in battle while fighting Hannibal inconclusively near Venusia, Apulia.
 Hannibal destroys a Roman force at the Battle of Petelia.

 Seleucid Empire 
 Antiochus III advances into Bactria, which is ruled by the Greco-Bactrian king Euthydemus I, and defeats Euthydemus at the Battle of the Arius. After resisting a siege of his capital Bactra (Balkh) by the Seleucids, Euthydemus obtains an honourable peace by which Antiochus promises Euthydemus' son Demetrius the hand of one of his daughters.

 China 
 Zhang Han defeats and kills the rebel leader Xiang Liang in the Battle of Dingtao.
 Qin Prime Minister Li Si is executed by Qin Er Shi, having been conspired against by the eunuch Zhao Gao, who replaces him as Prime Minister.
 Zhang Han seizes the Zhao capital Handan and besieges its king Zhao Xie in Julu. 
 Xiang Liang's nephew Xiang Yu seizes control of Liang's army.

Births 
 Liu Ruyi, Chinese prince and only son of the first Han emperor Liu Bang (d. 194 BC)
 Polybius, Greek historian, famous for his book called "The Histories" or "The Rise of the Roman Empire", covering in detail the period between 220 and 146 BC (d. 120 BC)

Deaths 
 Marcus Claudius Marcellus, Roman general who has captured Syracuse during the Second Punic War and has become known as "the sword of Rome" (b. 268 BC)
 Li Si, Chinese philosopher and politician (assassinated) (b. 280 BC)

References